Constantinos "Costas" Kilias  is a Greek Australian magistrate and actor.

Early life 
Kilias is the son of Greek immigrants who arrived in Australia in 1954, from the town of Kolindros, in region of Macedonia in Northern Greece.

Legal career 
After graduating from the University of Melbourne in the early 1980s, Kilias was admitted to the Victorian Bar in 1986.

Kilias currently works as a magistrate in Melbourne.

Acting career
Kilias is best known for his role as Farouk in The Castle, as well as "Tony the Yugoslav" in The Wog Boy and Wog Boy 2: Kings of Mykonos. He also had roles in Fat Tony & Co. as the Head of Hellenic Anti Drug Dept  and in the film The Wannabes, as Adrian.  He also appeared in some episodes of Fat Pizza.

References

External links 

Male actors from Melbourne
Australian barristers
Australian magistrates
Australian people of Greek descent
Living people
1960 births